Three Steps on Earth is a 1965 Polish drama film directed by Jerzy Hoffman and Edward Skórzewski. It was entered into the 4th Moscow International Film Festival where it won a Silver Prize.

Cast
 Irena Orska as Marysia Majchrowska (segment "Dzień urodzin")
 Tadeusz Fijewski as Aleksander Majchrowski (segment "Dzień urodzin")
 Anna Ciepielewska as Dr. Wysocka (segment "Godzina drogi")
 Ewa Wiśniewska as Anna Gościk (segment "Rozwód po polsku")
 Ludwik Pak as Ludwik Gościk (segment "Rozwód po polsku")
 Mieczysław Czechowicz as Szlenkiel (segment "Rozwód po polsku")
 Wiesław Michnikowski as Judge (segment "Rozwód po polsku")
 Kazimierz Rudzki as Advocate (segment "Rozwód po polsku")
 Henryk Bąk as Majchrowski's Friend (segment "Dzień urodzin")
 Bohdan Ejmont as Father (segment "Godzina drogi")
 Wiesław Gołas as Szkudlarek (segment "Dzień urodzin")
 Roman Kłosowski as Bystry (segment "Dzień urodzin")
 Bogumił Kobiela as Clerk (segment "Rozwód po polsku")

References

External links
 

1965 films
1965 drama films
1960s Polish-language films
Polish black-and-white films
Films directed by Jerzy Hoffman
Polish drama films